Orthogonius kumatai is a species of ground beetle in the subfamily Orthogoniinae. It was described by Habu in 1979.

References

kumatai
Beetles described in 1979